Bistrialites is an involute, globose Clydonautilacean belonging to the Liroceratidae with a reniform (kidney-shaped) whorl section, large funnel-shaped umbilicus, smooth surface except for spiral ornament in the region of the umbilical shoulder. Bistrialites comes from the Lower Carboniferous (Mississippian) of Europe.

References
Bernhard Kummel, 1964. Nautiloidea – Nautilida; Treatise on Invertebrate Paleontology, Part K. Geological Society of America and University of Kansas press, R.C. Moore (ed.) -- Liroceratidae K444 -K447.

Nautiloids